Revolutionary Serbia, or Karađorđe's Serbia, refers to the state established by the Serbian revolutionaries in Ottoman Serbia (Sanjak of Smederevo) after the start of the First Serbian Uprising against the Ottoman Empire in 1804. The Sublime Porte first officially recognized the state as autonomous in January 1807, however, the Serbian revolutionaries rejected the treaty and continued fighting the Ottomans until 1813. Although the first uprising was crushed, it was followed by the Second Serbian Uprising in 1815, which resulted in the creation of the Principality of Serbia, as it gained semi-independence from the Ottoman Empire in 1817.

Political history

First Serbian Uprising

Stratimirović's Memorandum
Stratimirović's Memorandum (1804)

Ičko's Peace

Between July and October 1806 Petar Ičko, an Ottoman dragoman (translator-diplomat) and representative of the Serbian rebels, negotiated a peace treaty known in historiography as "Ičko's Peace". Ičko had been sent to Constantinople twice in the latter half of 1806 to negotiate peace. The Ottomans seemed ready to grant Serbia autonomy following rebel victories in 1805 and 1806, also pressured by the Russian Empire, which had taken Moldavia and Wallachia; they agreed to a sort of autonomy and clearer stipulation of taxes in January 1807, by which time the rebels had already taken Belgrade. The rebels rejected the treaty and sought Russian aid to their independence, while the Ottomans had declared war on Russia in December 1806. A Russo-Serbian alliance treaty was signed on 10 June 1807.

Russo-Serbian Alliance

On 10 July 1807, the Serbian rebels under Karađorđe signed an alliance with the Russian Empire during the First Serbian Uprising. After the Ottoman Empire had allied itself with Napoleon's France in late 1806, and was subsequently at war with Russia and Britain, it sought to meet the demands of the Serbian rebels. At the same time, the Russians offered the Serbs aid and cooperation. The Serbs chose alliance with the Russians over autonomy under the Ottomans (as set by the "Ičko's Peace"). Karađorđe was to receive arms, and military and medical missions, which proved to be a turning point in the Serbian Revolution.

Proclamations
A proclamation (Slavonic-Serbian: Проглашенie) calling for the unity of Serbs, dated 21 February 1809.
A proclamation with 15 points, dated 16 August 1809.

Treaty of Bucharest (1812)

Government

Rule was divided between Grand Vožd Karađorđe, the Narodna Skupština (People's Assembly) and the Praviteljstvujušči Sovjet (Governing Council), established in 1805.

Governing Council

The Governing Council was established by recommendation of the Russian Minister of Foreign Affairs Czartoryski and on the proposal of some of the voivodes (Jakov and Matija Nenadović, Milan Obrenović, Sima Marković). The idea of Boža Grujović, the first secretary, and Matija Nenadović, the first president, was that the council would become the government of the new Serbian state. It had to organize and supervise the administration, the economy, army supply, order and peace, judiciary, and foreign policy.

Ministries

In 1811, the government system was reorganized, with the formation of ministries (popečiteljstva) instead of nahija-representatives.

Maps

See also

 Timeline of the Serbian Revolution

References

Sources
 
 
 
 
 Janjić, Jovan. "Role of clergy in the creation and function of the Serbian state from the time of First Serbian Uprising." Zbornik Matice srpske za drustvene nauke 150 (2015): 53-64.
 Janjić, Jovan. "The role of the clergy in the creation and work of the state authorities during the first Serbian uprising: Part one." Zbornik Matice srpske za drustvene nauke 149 (2014): 901-927.
 
  
 
 
 
 
 
 
 
 

States and territories established in 1804
States and territories disestablished in 1813
Revolutionary Serbia
Revolutionary Serbia
Revolutionary Serbia
Revolutionary Serbia
Former countries in Europe
Revolutionary Serbia
Revolutionary Serbia